Jackson Woods (born 1 February 1993 in Latrobe, Tasmania) is an amateur boxer who has represented Australia at the World Youth Games and Commonwealth Youth Games. He was selected for the 2012 Summer Olympics in the flyweight division.

Woods began boxing in 2006 and won the Tasmanian junior title that same year. He has appeared at the Australian titles every year since then. In 2010, he won the Australian title, earning him a trip to the World Youth Games in Baku where he made the quarter finals. In 2011, he went to the Commonwealth Youth Games on the Isle of Man where he won a silver medal in his weight class. In 2012, he stepped up to senior level winning both the Australian and Oceania titles and earning a place at the London Olympics.

References 

1993 births
Living people
Flyweight boxers
Olympic boxers of Australia
Boxers at the 2012 Summer Olympics
Boxers at the 2014 Commonwealth Games
Commonwealth Games competitors for Australia
Sportsmen from Tasmania
People from Latrobe, Tasmania
Australian Institute of Sport boxers
Australian male boxers